The Romanian Sign Language (LSR) is the sign language used by deaf people in Romania. In Romania, the first organization dedicated to people with hearing impairments was the Romanian Society of the Deaf-Mute, established on 9 November 1919.

References

French Sign Language family
Languages of Romania